The various ethnolinguistic groups found in the Caucasus, Central Asia, Europe, the Middle East, North Africa and/or South Asia demonstrate differing rates of particular Y-DNA haplogroups.

In the table below, the first two columns identify ethnolinguistic groups. Subsequent columns represent the sample size (n) of the study or studies cited, and the percentage of each haplogroup found in that particular sample.

(Data from studies conducted before 2004 may be inaccurate or a broad estimate, due to obsolete haplogroup naming systems – e.g. the former Haplogroup 2 included members of the relatively unrelated haplogroups known later as Haplogroup G and macrohaplogroup IJ [which comprises haplogroups I and J].)

See also

 Genetics
 Human mitochondrial DNA haplogroups
 Human genome
 Genetic genealogy
 Genealogical DNA testing
 Race and genetics
 Genetic history
 Timeline of human evolution
 Recent African origin of modern humans
 Genetic history of the British Isles
 Genetic history of the Middle East
 Genetics and archaeogenetics of South Asia
 Genetic history of Europe
 Genetic history of Italy
 Genetic history of indigenous peoples of the Americas
 Genetic studies on Jews

 Lists of Y-DNA haplogroups according to their distribution
 List of haplogroups of historical and famous figures
 Y-chromosome haplogroups in populations of the world
 Y-DNA haplogroups in populations of Europe
 Y-DNA haplogroups in populations of the Near East
 Y-DNA haplogroups in populations of North Africa
 Y-DNA haplogroups in populations of South Asia
 Y-DNA haplogroups in populations of Central and North Asia
 Y-DNA haplogroups in populations of East and Southeast Asia
 Y-DNA haplogroups in populations of Sub-Saharan Africa
 Y-DNA haplogroups in populations of Oceania
 Y-DNA haplogroups in indigenous peoples of the Americas
 Haplogroup G (Y-DNA) by country

References

External links
 World Haplogroups Maps
 Phylogeography of Y-Chromosome Haplogroup I Reveals Distinct Domains of Prehistoric Gene Flow in Europe
 Phylogeographic Analysis of Haplogroup E3b (E-M215) Y Chromosomes Reveals Multiple Migratory Events Within and Out Of Africa
 Y-chromosome haplogroup N dispersals from south Siberia to Europe
 A Synthesis of Haplogroup R2
 High-Resolution Phylogenetic Analysis of Southeastern Europe (SEE) Traces Major Episodes of Paternal Gene Flow Among Slavic Populations
 A prehistory of Indian Y chromosomes: Evaluating demic diffusion scenarios - Appears to be Indian nationalistic declined ...
 Polarity and Temporality of High-Resolution Y-Chromosome Distributions in India Identify Both Indigenous and Exogenous Expansions and Reveal Minor Genetic Influence of Central Asian Pastoralists
 Mitochondrial DNA and Y-Chromosome Variation in the Caucasus
 YunusbaevBB
 Map and tree based upon the current YCC 2003 tree
 
 Frequencies of Haplogroup I and its Subhaplogroups

Ethnic groups
Genetic genealogy
Race (human categorization)
Genetics-related lists